The Rice Twins is a  Swedish techno-duo from Stockholm, formed in 2005 by Valdemar Gezelius and Jesper Engström. 

2006 they released the song For Penny and Alexis and EP Reach For the Flute.

External links
The Rice Twins MySpace-page

Swedish electronic music groups
Swedish musical duos